The 1987 Women's Davies & Tate British Open Squash Championships was held at the South Bank Squash Club, Wandsworth with the later stages being held at the Wembley Conference Centre in London from 7–14 April 1987. The event was won for the fourth consecutive year by Susan Devoy who defeated Martine Le Moignan in the final.

Seeds

Draw and results

First round

Second round

Third round

Quarter-finals

Semi-finals

Final

References

Women's British Open Squash Championships
Women's British Open Squash Championship
Women's British Open Squash Championship
Women's British Open Squash Championship
Women's British Open Squash Championship
British Open Squash Championship
Women's British Open Squash Championship